The name Zephyria derives from zephyr, a light wind. It can refer to:

Zephyria, a classical albedo feature on Mars
Zephyria Tholus, a nearby mountain on Mars
Zephyria Planum, a nearby plain on Mars
Rhagoletis zephyria, a species of fruit fly
Adaina zephyria, a species of moth
Automeris zephyria, an extinct species of silkworm
Zephyria island, the fictional homeland of Zorn in the anime Son of Zorn